The Rebels is a Canadian drama film, directed by Denis Héroux and released in 1972. A historical drama set during the Lower Canada Rebellion of 1837, the film centres on the romance between Simon de Bellefeuille (Daniel Pilon), a rebel in the village of Saint-Benoît, and Julie Lambert (Christine Olivier).

The film's cast also includes Mylène Demongeot, Jean Duceppe, Frédéric de Pasquale, Daniel Gadouas, Roland Chenail, Rose-Rey Duzil, Gérard Poirier, Yvan Ducharme, Jacques Desrosiers, Jean Coutu, Bertrand Gagnon, José Descombes, Barry Baldaro, Dave Broadfoot, Jacques Famery and Jacques Thisdale.

The film takes its title from Voltaire's infamous dismissal of New France as "a few acres of snow (quelques arpents de neige)".

The film was entered into the Best Motion Picture competition at the 24th Canadian Film Awards.

References

External links

1972 films
1972 drama films
Canadian historical drama films
Canadian romantic drama films
Films shot in Quebec
Films set in Quebec
Films directed by Denis Héroux
Lower Canada Rebellion war films
French-language Canadian films
1970s Canadian films